Sentell may refer to:

 Liza Walton Sentell, character on American soap opera, Search for Tomorrow
 Paul Sentell (1879–1923), American baseball player, manager, and umpire
 Travis Sentell, character on American soap opera, Search for Tomorrow